Umm Kalkha was a small Palestinian village in the Ramle Subdistrict of Mandatory Palestine.  It was depopulated during the 1947–48 Civil War in Mandatory Palestine on April 7, 1948, during Operation Nachshon. It was located 12.5 km south of Ramla, situated on the northern banks of Wadi al-Sarar.

History
In 1838,  Um Kelkha was noted as a place "in ruins or deserted."

In 1882, the PEF's Survey of Western Palestine (SWP)  noted: "There are traces here of an old town, caves,  cisterns of rubble, masonry, and pottery fragments."

British Mandate era
In the 1922 census of Palestine, conducted by the British Mandate authorities, Umm Kalka had a population of 1 Muslim, increasing sharply in the  1931 census  24 Muslims, in 6 houses.

In  the  1945 statistics  the population was 60, all Muslims, while the total land area was 1,405  dunams, according to an official land and population survey. Of this,  21  dunums of land were used for citrus and bananas, 93 dunums were plantations or  irrigated land, 1,119 were for cereals,  while a total of 63 dunams were classified as non-cultivable areas.

1948, aftermath
The Israeli settlement of Yesodot was established on Umm Khalkha land.

References

Bibliography

External links
Welcome To Umm Kalkha
Umm Kalkha,  Zochrot
Survey of Western Palestine, Map 16:   IAA, Wikimedia commons
Umm Kalkha at Khalil Sakakini Cultural Center

Arab villages depopulated during the 1948 Arab–Israeli War
District of Ramla